The Western Marble Arch (WMA) Synagogue is a Jewish place of worship in central London. The WMA is the result of a merger between the Western and the Marble Arch Synagogues, with the former congregation dating back to 1761. The current building is in Great Cumberland Place, Westminster. It is a leading Orthodox Judaism synagogue and offers religious and social activities to its members and the wider community.

History

Western Synagogue

The Western Synagogue was founded in 1761 in Great Pulteney Street, Westminster.  The congregation, formally named, in the transliteration of the era,  Hebra Kaddisha Shel Gemillith Hassadim, Westminster (Holy Congregation of Acts of Charity, Westminster) first met in the home of Wolf Liepman, a prosperous immigrant merchant from St. Petersburg. A series of leased spaces followed until 1826 when the congregation built an elaborate synagogue in St. Alban's Place, Haymarket (London) and renamed itself The Western  Synagogue.

Spiritual leadership
Rabbi Lionel Rosenfeld
 Rabbi Sam Taylor
 Sir Samuel Montagu MP (Lord Swaythling)
 Sir Stuart Samuel
 Viscount David de Stern
 Constance, Lady Battersea, wife of Cyril Flower, 1st Baron Battersea
 Hannah Primrose, Countess of Rosebery
Harold Pasha
 Barrington Black
 Lord David Gold
 Sir Gerald Ronson CBE
 Anthony Yadgaroff

See also
Synagogue architecture
Modern Orthodox Judaism
Ashkenazi Jews

Bibliography
 Picciotto, Sketches of Anglo-Jewish History

References

External links
Synagogue Website
Western Marble Arch Synagogue on Jewish Communities and Records - UK (hosted by jewishgen.org).

1761 establishments in England
Religious organizations established in 1761
Synagogues in London
Religion in the City of Westminster
18th-century synagogues
Modern Orthodox Judaism in Europe
Modern Orthodox synagogues
1760s in London